Bruno Trojani (29 August 1907 – 14 January 1966) was a Swiss ski jumper. He competed in the individual event at the 1928 Winter Olympics.

References

1907 births
1966 deaths
Swiss male ski jumpers
Olympic ski jumpers of Switzerland
Ski jumpers at the 1928 Winter Olympics
Place of birth missing